Larzelere Tavern is a historic inn and tavern located two miles north of Branchport in Yates County, New York. It is a large, 2-story, three-bay-wide, four-bay-deep, rectangular gable-roofed main block with a -story, gable-roofed side wing.  Also on the property are two historic outhouses and a shed / garage.  Built originally as an inn and tavern, the structure was later used as a Grange Hall and later as a bed and breakfast.

It was listed on the National Register of Historic Places in 1997.

References

Drinking establishments on the National Register of Historic Places in New York (state)
Commercial buildings completed in 1823
Hotel buildings on the National Register of Historic Places in New York (state)
Buildings and structures in Yates County, New York
Taverns in New York (state)
National Register of Historic Places in Yates County, New York
Taverns on the National Register of Historic Places in New York (state)
1823 establishments in New York (state)